Nicholas Bamforth BCL, MA (Oxon) is a Fellow in Law at Queen's College, Oxford, and a lecturer in Law
at the University of Oxford since 1999.  He had previously worked at UCL
and Cambridge.
In 2003-4, he was a Hauser Global Research Fellow at New York University.

In October 2006 he became an elected member of the Council of the University. From March 2010 to March 2011, he held the office of Junior Proctor of Oxford University, a post lasting for one year. He has commented from time to time in the media concerning issues relating to university governance.

His research and teaching interests lie in public (constitutional and administrative) law, human rights law, anti-discrimination law and philosophy of law. He edited a set of essays called "Sex Rights" in 2005 seeking to explore the role and limitations of ideas of human rights in the area of gender and sexuality, a particular topic of interest.

Books
 Sexuality, Morals and Justice (London, Cassell, 1997)
 Public Law in a Multi-layered Constitution (ed. with P. Leyland, Oxford, Hart, 2003)
 Patriarchal Religion, Sexuality and Gender (with D. Richards, Cambridge, Cambridge University Press, 2008)
 Discrimination Law: Theory and Context (with C. O'Cinneide and M. Malik, London, Thomson/Sweet & Maxwell, 2008)
  
Working on a textbook for Oxford University Press (human rights law) and on a monograph on the public law-private law distinction.

He was  editor of Sex Rights, the 2002 series of Oxford Amnesty Lectures concerning human rights, gender and sexuality (Oxford University Press, 2004).

References

External links
 faculty page at Oxford

Bamforth, Nicholas
Bamforth, Nicholas
Bamforth, Nicholas
Bamforth, Nicholas
British legal scholars
English lawyers
Legal scholars of the University of Oxford
Year of birth missing (living people)